Kularathna Central College (Sinhala:කුලරත්න මධ්‍ය විද්‍යාලය) is a school located in Godakawela, Ratnapura District, Sabaragamuwa Province, Sri Lanka, which provides secondary education for boys and girls.

Provincial schools in Sri Lanka
Schools in Ratnapura District
Educational institutions established in 1967
1967 establishments in Ceylon